

Events

March events
 March 14 - El Virilla train accident in Costa Rica kills 248 people.

May events
 May 1 - Burlington Refrigerator Express (BREX) is formed as a joint venture between the Chicago, Burlington and Quincy Railroad (CB&Q) and the Fruit Growers Express (FGE).
 May 3 - U.K. General Strike commences, continuing to affect railways until May 12.
 May 8 - A. Philip Randolph organizes the Brotherhood of Sleeping Car Porters, considered a major labor as well as civil rights milestone.
 May 20 - The United States Railway Labor Act becomes law.

July events
 July 6 - First electric railway in the Soviet Union opens, connecting Baku, Azerbaijan, with its oil workers’ suburban settlements.
 July 9 - The first use of a radiotelephone on a train, on the New York Central Railroad.
 July 23 - Law enacted to nationalize rail transport in Belgium fully as Société Nationale des Chemins de fer Belges/Nationale Maatschappij der Belgische Spoorwegen.

August events
 August - The Chicago, Milwaukee, St. Paul and Pacific Railroad (the "Milwaukee Road") introduces the Arrow passenger train between Chicago, Illinois and Omaha, Nebraska.

September events
 September 12 - Chemin de Fer du Nord introduces Flèche d’Or all-first-class Pullman boat train service between Paris and Calais, France.

October events 
 October 10 – Yachihata Station in Japan is opened.

December events
 December 20 – Opening of first section of underground railway in Australia, the City Circle between Central and St. James railway stations in Sydney (John Bradfield (engineer)).

Unknown date events
 Atlantic Coast Line Railroad gains control of the Atlanta, Birmingham and Coast Railroad.
 American Car and Foundry acquires J. G. Brill and Company.

Births

Deaths

October deaths
 October 20 - Eugene V. Debs, American labor leader, founding member of the Brotherhood of Locomotive Firemen, founder of the American Railway Union, arrested during the Pullman strike in Chicago, Illinois (born 1855).

References